Damjanović (originally meaning "son of Damjan") is a Serbian and Croatian surname. It may refer to:

 Aleksandar Damjanović (born 1973), Bosnian basketball coach, administrator and former player
 Božidarka Kika Damjanović-Marković (1920-1996), Yugoslav Partisan commander
 Dalibor Damjanović (born 1977), Slovenian basketball coach
 Darko Damjanović (born 1977), Serb-Swiss footballer
 Dario Damjanović (born 1981), Bosnian footballer
 Dejan Damjanović (born 1981), Montenegrin footballer
 Dejan Damjanović (born 1986), Montenegrin footballer
 Dragan Damjanovic (born 1957), Swiss-Bosnian-Herzegovinian materials scientist
 Jovica Damjanović (born 1975), Serbian footballer
 Jovan Damjanović (born 1982), Serbian footballer
 Jovo Damjanović (born 1996), Montenegrin-born Qatari handball player
 Kozma Damjanović, Serbian icon painter
 Marija Damjanović (born 2000), Bosnia and Herzegovina footballer
 Mato Damjanović (1927–2011), Yugoslav chess player
 Milan Damjanović (1943–2006), Yugoslav-Serb footballer
 Milena Damjanovic, filmmaker known for her 1974 short film, Sharing the Dream, about Indigenous Australian dance workshops
 Miljan Damjanović (born 1984), Serbian politician
 Miodrag Damjanović (1893-1956), Serbian brigadier general of the Royal Yugoslav Army
 Mirko Damjanović (1937-2010), Serbian football coach
 Miroljub Damjanović (born 1950), Serbian basketball player
 Nevena Damjanović (born 1993), Serbian footballer
 Ratomir Damjanović (born 1945), Serbian radio journalist, writer and reciter
 Sanja Damjanović (born 1972), physicist and Minister of Science in the government of Montenegro
 Slavko Damjanović (born 1992), Serbian footballer
 Sreten Damjanović (born 1946), Serbian Greco-Roman wrestler
 Stipe Damjanović (born 1969), Croatian wrestler
 Stjepan Damjanović (born 1946), Croatian Slavist
 Vasilije Damjanović (1734-1792), Serbian writer, merchant, senator and municipal judge

See also
Damnjanović
Damjanić
Damijanić

Croatian surnames
Serbian surnames
Patronymic surnames
Surnames from given names